Triple Canopy is a New York-based "magazine" and 501(c)(3) nonprofit organization. Issues of the "magazine" are published online over the course of several months. Each issue focuses on specific questions and areas of concern, and features works of art and literature, conversations, performances, exhibitions, and books. Triple Canopy is dedicated to “sustained inquiry, careful reading and viewing, resisting and expanding the present.” In “The Binder and the Server,”  a memoir-manifesto published in 2010, the editors proclaimed their intention to “slow down the internet”; subsequently, reflecting on the erosion of the line between “online” and “offline,” they shifted to “slow down the world.”   Triple Canopy is certified by Working Artists and the Greater Economy (W.A.G.E.). Triple Canopy’s archive was acquired by the Fales Library and Special Collection at New York University.

Overview
Founded as an editorial collective in 2007, Triple Canopy currently consists of a staff of editors, writers, artists, researchers, designers, and web developers based in New York, Los Angeles, San Francisco, Minneapolis, Mexico City, and Berlin. Triple Canopy’s digital platform acts as the hub for publishing activities that occur online, in print, and as events and exhibitions. From the design of the platform to the editing of essays and artworks, Triple Canopy is meant to foster attentive reading, prolonged engagements—in opposition to the incessant distraction that characterizes the attention economy.

Due to the presentation of substantive, carefully edited  material that is designed to be read and viewed online, and makes use of the characteristics of the browser, Triple Canopy's work has been referred to as "the sort of stuff people say is not happening on the internet." Triple Canopy draws on the legacy of avant-garde print magazines and journals, but also incorporates the history of new media publications such as the magazine-in-a-box Aspen, the audio cassette magazine Tellus, and the experimental publication Blast.

The central form for Triple Canopy’s publishing activities is the magazine issue. Issues may include digital works of art and literature, public conversations, books, editions, performances, and exhibitions. New issues are devoted to the collaborative production of bodies of knowledge around specific questions and concerns. Issues are published over the course of several months, often concurrently, at a rate of approximately three per year. As of December 2018, Triple Canopy has published twenty-five issues of the magazine and twelve books, and has worked with more than nine hundred contributors.

Triple Canopy has collectively authored works that have been presented by the Whitney Museum of American Art, the Museum of Modern Art (New York), MoMA PS1, MCA Denver, and Kunsthalle Wien, among other institutions. Triple Canopy creates open-source publishing systems that enable the magazine to elucidate relationships between activities that occur on the web, in print, and in person. Triple Canopy has organized numerous public programs and participated in residencies in New York, Los Angeles, Mexico City, Chicago, Tucson, Paris, Berlin, Sarajevo, Turin, and elsewhere. The magazine regularly organizes the Publication Intensive, a free two-week program in the history and contemporary practice of publication.

Triple Canopy’s office and venue is in Manhattan, but the magazine maintains an active presence in Berlin and Los Angeles. Until 2017, Triple Canopy shared a space in Greenpoint, Brooklyn, with film and electronic art venue Light Industry  and open-source educational program The Public School New York. Triple Canopy's venue regularly hosts  performances, lectures, screenings, talks, and other public events.

Critical response
The New York Times called Triple Canopy “a multitasking brain trust of a nonprofit that publishes an extremely smart Internet magazine”; in another article, in 2017, the paper declared that Triple Canopy “broke the mold of traditional Web design; instead of scrolling down, readers page left and right, which gives the work a framed look.… Their concept of ‘slowing down the Internet’ has come to seem prescient.”  The New Yorkers Sasha Frere-Jones commented that "Triple Canopy may be a journal of high intellectual resolution, but it is also very easy to read on a computer screen."  In a Financial Times article naming the five best art magazines, frieze editorial director Jennifer Higgie wrote that Triple Canopy “lets you watch videos, is not limited by word or page length, and can be read simultaneously by people anywhere in the world. In other words, it’s the future." In a note about David Graeber’s essay on the history of debt in issue 10, Bookforum praised the magazine for integrating the immersion of print with the immediacy of the internet. In 2012, Triple Canopy received the Art Journal Award for the best work to have appeared in Art Journal, published by the College Art Association, in the previous year (Triple Canopy’s contribution was “The Binder and the Server,” essay on the image and value of labor in contemporary publishing practices).

Print publications
 Triple Canopy, ed., Invalid Format: An Anthology of Triple Canopy, Volume 1 (2012) 
 Sarah Crowner, David Horvitz, and Ariana Reines, Miscellaneous Uncatalogued Material (2012)
 Triple Canopy, The Binder and the Server (2012)
 Triple Canopy, ed., Invalid Format: An Anthology of Triple Canopy, Volume 2 (2012)
 Triple Canopy, ed., Corrected Slogans: Reading and Writing Conceptualism (2013; second printing, 2015)
 Triple Canopy, ed., Invalid Format: An Anthology of Triple Canopy, Volume 3 (2014)
 K.D., Headless (2015; ebook, 2016)
 Triple Canopy, ed., Speculations (“The future is __”) (2015)
 Triple Canopy and Ralph Lemon, eds., On Value (2015)
Anna Della Subin, Not Dead But Sleeping (2016; ebook, 2015)
 Sowon Kwon, S as in Samsam (2017)
 Ulf Stolterfoht with Peter Dittmer, translated by Shane Anderson with Megan Ewing, The Amme Talks (2017)
 Hilton Als with Jennifer Krasinski, Andy Warhol: The Series (2017)

List of notable contributors
 Fatima Al Qadiri
 Hilton Als
 Cory Arcangel
 Kevin Beasley
 Mel Bochner
 Ted Chiang
 Joshua Cohen (writer)
 Gabriella Coleman
 Samuel R. Delany
 Renee Gladman
 Rivka Galchen
 David Graeber
  Lucy Ives
 Steffani Jemison
 Jon Kessler
 Katie Kitamura
 Josh Kline
 Wayne Koestenbaum
 Hari Kunzru
 Ralph Lemon
 David Levine
 Glenn Ligon
 Jill Magid
 Tom McCarthy
 Fred Moten
 Trevor Paglen
 William Pope.L
 Kameelah Janan Rasheed
 Ariana Reines
 Namwali Serpell
 Bob Stein (computer pioneer)
Anna Della Subin
 Martine Syms
 Astra Taylor
 Lynne Tillman
 Mónica de la Torre
 Constance DeJong

See also

 List of literary magazines
 List of art magazines

References

External links 
 Triple Canopy
 The State of Inauthenticity - an analysis of the International Necronautical Society from Issue 1
 Star Wars: A New Heap - John Powers' acclaimed essay from Issue 4
 The Used Future - Kevin Kelly's review of Star Wars: A New Heap
 To Have Is to Owe - David Graeber's essay on the history of debt from Issue 10
 Notes in Time - a digital reanimation of Nancy Spero's landmark work from Issue 10
 Digitizing Art Online with Triple Canopy - an analysis of the digitized "Notes in Time"
 We Are All Anonymous - a conversation which brought together Gabriella Coleman (author of essay, "Our Weirdness Is Free," from Issue 15), David Auerbach (author of the essay, "Anonymity as Culture: Treatise," from Issue 15) and lawyer James Grimmelmann
 International Art English - Alix Rule and David Levine's essay on the rise of the art-world press release from Issue 16
 I'd Rather Talk About the Post-part - an essay about the value of artworks and of the labor and bodies that make them by Ralph Lemon
 High Treason - a video game against official nationalism by Juan Caloca for Issue 22
 Triptych: Texas Pool Party - Namwali Serpell's three-part fiction on the 2015 McKinney, Texas, pool party incident for Issue 23
 "Triple Canopy: 'Slowing Down the Internet'", Sasha Frere-Jones,The New Yorker, 17 January 2012
 "New York literary magazines – start spreading the news", Hermione Hoby, The Observer, 5 January 2013
 "Critics and Online Outlets Leading the Vanguard in Arts Writing", Mary Louise Schumacher, Nieman Reports, 24 May 2018

Visual arts magazines published in the United States
Online magazines published in the United States
Magazines established in 2007
Magazines published in New York City
2007 establishments in New York City